Buzi, in Iran, may refer to:
 Buzi-ye Bala
 Buzi-ye Seyf
 Buzi Rural District